Saperda bilabilis is a species of beetle in the family Cerambycidae. It was described by Newman in 1850.

References

bilabilis
Beetles described in 1850